Nu Piscium (ν Piscium) is an orange-hued binary star system in the zodiac constellation of Pisces. Prior to the formation of the modern constellation boundaries in 1930, it was designated 51 Ceti in the Cetus constellation. Nu Piscium is visible to the naked eye, having a combined apparent visual magnitude of 4.44. Based upon an annual parallax shift of 8.98 mas as seen from Earth, it is located about 363 light years from the Sun.

The primary, component A, is an evolved, K-type giant star with a stellar classification of K3 IIIb. It is a weak barium star, indicating that the atmosphere was previously enriched by accretion of s-process elements from what is now a white dwarf companion. The giant has 1.66 times the mass of the Sun and has expanded to about 34 times the Sun's radius. It is about 3.4 billion years old and is radiating 380 times the Sun's luminosity from its photosphere at an effective temperature of 4,154 K.

Naming

References

K-type giants
Barium stars
Binary stars
Pisces (constellation)
Piscium, Nu
BD+04 0293
Piscium, 106
007884
010380
0489